Ville Korhonen (born May 20, 1987) is a Finnish professional ice hockey forward who is currently an unrestricted free agent. He has previously played the majority of his professional career in his native Finland, with Ilves Tampere, Espoo Blues and Ässät Pori. On August 26, 2014, Korhonen accepted an initial two-month try-out contract with the Blues.

After two seasons with Ässät, Korhonen left the Liiga as a free agent to sign a one-year deal with German outfit, Schwenninger Wild Wings of the DEL for the 2018–19 season, on May 1, 2018. In 36 games for the Wild Wings, Korhonen collected 8 goals and 18 points, unable to help Schwenninger qualify for the post-season. He left the club at the conclusion of his contract.

Career statistics

Regular season and playoffs

References

External links

1987 births
Living people
Ässät players
Espoo Blues players
HK Dukla Michalovce players
Lempäälän Kisa players
EC VSV players
Ilves players
Schwenninger Wild Wings players
Ice hockey people from Tampere
VIK Västerås HK players
Finnish ice hockey left wingers
Finnish expatriate ice hockey players in Slovakia
Finnish expatriate ice hockey players in Germany
Finnish expatriate ice hockey players in Sweden
Finnish expatriate ice hockey players in Austria
Finnish expatriate ice hockey players in Italy